Yereymentau is a range of mountains in Akmola and Karaganda regions, Kazakhstan.

Yereymentau city lies at the northern end of the range and the village of Beloyarka at the southern. The Buiratau National Park is located in the Yereymentau Mountains, which are also part of a  Important Bird Area.

Geography 
Yereymentau is one of the subranges of the Kazakh Upland system. It is composed by a number of ridges roughly aligned from north to south in the northern section of the range, and from southwest to northeast in the southern. Some of the main ridges of the Yereymentau are Altyntau —highest point — in the north, Zhartas —highest point — in the west, Karatau —highest point — in the east, as well as Bozachikirtau —highest point . 

The mountains are of moderate height and have smooth slopes, as well as some rocky outcrops and cliffs in places. River Olenti flows at the feet of the eastern flank of the range. Some right tributaries of the Sileti originate on the western slopes of the Yereymentau and the Moiyldy, a tributary of the Ishim, has its sources at the southern end.

See also
Geography of Kazakhstan

References

External links

Kazakhstan - gnpp-buiratau.kz — About the park

Kazakh Uplands
Geography of Akmola Region
Geography of Karaganda Region
Important Bird Areas of Kazakhstan